Dual state or Dual State may refer to:

Austria-Hungary
The Dual State: A Contribution to the Theory of Dictatorship, 1941 book by Ernst Fraenkel (political scientist)
Dual state (model), a political science model originated by Fraenkel in this book
Involving two states